Valipe is a village in Hiiumaa Parish, Hiiu County in northwestern Estonia.
Valipe has about 10 people.

References

Villages in Hiiu County